Cita Rahayu, stage name Cita Citata (born August 14, 1994), is an Indonesian singer and actress. Cita sings the song "Sakitnya Tuh Disini", in English ( The Pain in here "heart") introduced in the soap opera Diam-Diam Suka: Cinta Lama Bersemi Kembali. The song won an award for "Most Famous Soap Opera Soundtrack" at the 2014 SCTV Awards. She also played a role in the soap opera.

Career
When she was young, Cita Citata often sang dangdut at wedding receptions with Gemilang Abdi Pratama. She began to sing pop in high school. Then, she began to sing jazz. She started her career as a jazz singer, but joined Sani Music Indonesia in mid 2014 as a dangdut singer. Her single "Kalimera Athena" was written by Doel Sumbang. Citata released the single "Sakitnya Tuh Disini" because of a breakup with Gemilang (familiarly called Shahmi). In a few weeks, the song topped various radio stations in Indonesia. Subsequently, she was earning a awards for Best Contemporary Dangdut Female Solo Artist at the 18th Annual Anugerah Musik Indonesia

In addition, Cita had released second single "Goyang Dumang" and return reaching to success, like her debut single. YouTube Rewind listed her music video for 2015 Most Popular Music Video which released by YouTube, occupied position No. 2. Soon after that, Cita was the No. 1 for most requested artist on Google in Indonesia. Cita had released her EP album Sakitnya Tuh Disini and produced other single, such as "Aku Mah Apa Atuh" and "Meriang".

Discography

Studio albums
 Sakitnya Tuh Disini (2014)

Single

Filmography

Television

Television film

Commercial
 Bintang Toedjoe Panas Dalam (2015; with Trio Ubur Ubur)

Awards and nominations

References

External links
 
 
 

1994 births
Living people
Indonesian Muslims
People from Bandung
Sundanese people
Minangkabau people
21st-century Indonesian women singers
Indonesian dangdut singers
Indonesian pop singers
Indonesian television actresses
Actresses from West Java
Musicians from West Java
Anugerah Musik Indonesia winners